Ciudad Canatlán is a city and seat of the municipality of Canatlán, in the state of Durango, north-western Mexico. As of 2010, the city of Canatlán had a population of 11,495.

References

Populated places in Durango